Pingyuan County (postal: Pingyun; , Hakka: Phin-yen) is a county in the northeast of Guangdong Province, People's Republic of China. It is under the administration of Meizhou City.

Geography
Pingyuan County is located in the northeast of Guangdong province, on the border between Guangdong, Jiangxi and Fujian province. It was founded in the Ming Dynasty Jiajing in the 42nd year (year 1863). Because it is located between Wuping (in Fujian) and Anyuan County (in Jiangxi), it was named ‘Pingyuan’.

Pingyuan County is under the jurisdiction of Mei County which is known as the home of standard Hakka. The total area of Pingyuan is 1381 square kilometers. Now it has 12 towns with the population of 250 thousand.

Climate

Ethno-linguistic make-up

Pingyuan is noted for its large Hakka population.

References

External links
Pingyuan County Government's official website link

County-level divisions of Guangdong
Meizhou